The 1958 Brisbane Rugby League season was the 50th season of the Brisbane Rugby League premiership. Seven teams from across Brisbane competed for the premiership, which culminated in Past Brothers defeating Fortitude Valley 22-7 in the grand final.

Ladder

Finals 

Source:

References 

Rugby league in Brisbane
Brisbane Rugby League season